A planche is a skill in gymnastics and calisthenics in which the body is held parallel to the ground, while being supported above the floor by straight arms. It is a move that requires significant strength and balance.

There are many variations of a planche, although only two are accredited in artistic gymnastics: the straddle planche, and the full planche. Depending on the event, it can range from a B to a D skill, and must be held for at least two seconds. As an example, on gymnastic rings, the straddle planche is a B move, and the full planche is a C move.  On floor, straddle/full is A/B. The main muscle used in this exercise is the anterior deltoid, but the abdominals, chest, shoulders, upper back, lower back, and glutes also play important roles.

As the planche is a demanding position, athletes train for it with a progression of simpler moves, advancing to the next when they have gained mastery of the intermediate positions. A typical training progression usually consists of the frog stand, advanced frog stand, tuck planche, advanced tuck planche, straddle planche, and then full planche. The arms should be locked at all times in all positions, except frog stand.

Muscles used 

The muscles used in planche are:

 Biceps 
 Triceps
 Deltoid 
 Brachialis 
 Bicep femoris 
 Gluteus maximus 
 Latissimus dorsi
 Pectoralis major 
 Serratus anterior 
 Soleus
 Supraspinatus 
 Trapezius
 Tibialis anterior
 Quadriceps
 Wrist flexors

Possible injuries 

 Torn ligaments/ tendons in arms
 Wrist injury
 Shoulder injury 
 Elbow injury
 Inflammation of the tendons of the arms
  Injury in back/spine

See also
Bodyweight exercise
Mayurasana – peacock pose in yoga as exercise, the body supported on bent arms
Plank (exercise)
Gymnastics
Front Lever

References

Planche
Static elements (gymnastics)